Brunsbach (also: Knipperbach) is a small river of North Rhine-Westphalia, Germany. It is a left tributary of the Sülz. It flows into the Sülz near Rösrath.

See also
List of rivers of North Rhine-Westphalia

References

Rivers of North Rhine-Westphalia
Rivers of Germany